50th Street may refer to:
50th Street (Manhattan), New York City, United States
50 Street, Edmonton, Alberta, Canada

Subway stations

New York City
 50th Street (IRT Broadway–Seventh Avenue Line); serving the 
 50th Street (IND Eighth Avenue Line); serving the 
 50th Street (IRT Ninth Avenue Line) (demolished)
 50th Street (IRT Second Avenue Line) (demolished)
 50th Street (IRT Sixth Avenue Line) (demolished)
 47th–50th Streets–Rockefeller Center (IND Sixth Avenue Line); serving the 
 50th Street (BMT West End Line) in Brooklyn; serving the 
 Bay 50th Street (BMT West End Line) in Brooklyn; serving the

Other cities
 50th Street/Washington station in Phoenix, Arizona; serving Valley Metro Rail